Sovljak is a village in the municipality of Ub, Serbia. According to the 2011 census, the village has a population of 1,839 people.

References

External links

Populated places in Kolubara District